Faxe municipality is a municipality (Danish, kommune) in Denmark in Region Sjælland on the island of Zealand. The municipality covers an area of 406 km2 and has a population of 37,161 (2022). Its mayor as of January 2018 is Ole Vive. He is a member of the agrarian liberal Venstre political party.

On 1 January 2007 Faxe municipality, as the result of Kommunalreformen ("The Municipal Reform" of 2007), came into existence by merging the three former municipalities of Haslev, Fakse, and Rønnede.

Geography
On 5 June 2007, it was reported by national broadcaster Danmarks Radio that an unknown hill near Rønnede (town), named Kobanke, has the highest natural point of terrain,  on Sjælland.

Locations 
The ten largest locations in the municipality are as of 2022:

Population by postal district 
 4690 Haslev 17.698 citizens.
 4640 Faxe 6.600 citizens.
 4683 Rønnede 3.346 citizens.
 4653 Karise 3.299 citizens.
 4654 Faxe Ladeplads 3.000 citizens.

Landmarks

Several historic churches are located in Faxe Municipality including: Vester Egede Church, Braaby Church (Bråby Church), Faxe Church, Freerslev Church, Haslev Church and Roholte Church, (Kongsted Church), (Hylleholt Church), (Dalby Church) Sønder Dalby, Dalby-Tureby, (Karise Church) and (Ulse Church), (Tureby Church), (Alslev Church), (Smerup Church), (Vemmetofte Church), (Vemmetofte Monastery), (Vemmetofte Monastery Church), (Vemmetofte castle), (Øster Egede Church), (Tureby Church), (Spjellerup Church), (Øde Førslev Church), (Terslev Church) and (Teestrup Church). All the churches in the municipality and The manor houses of Bregentved and Jomfruens Egede and Gisselfeld, Gisselfeld Monastery and Bregentved Estate, Tryggevælde, Strandegård, Lindersvold, Rosendal, Turebylille, Sofiedal, Rødehus, Rosendal, Holtegård, Alslevgård and Lystrup also belong to the municipality. The manor houses of Bregentved and Jomfruens Egede are also situated in the municipality.

Economy
The municipality is home to the head offices of companies such as Royal Unibrew, Faxe Brewery and Danish Agro. Faxe Quarry is owned by the Belgian Lhoist Group.

Politics
Faxe's municipal council consists of 25 members, elected every four years. The municipal council has seven political committees.

Municipal council
Below are the municipal councils elected since the Municipal Reform of 2007.

Image gallery

References 

 Municipal statistics: NetBorger Kommunefakta, delivered from KMD aka Kommunedata (Municipal Data)
 Municipal mergers and neighbors: Eniro new municipalities map

External links 

 The Faxe municipality's official website (Danish only)

 
Municipalities of Region Zealand
Municipalities of Denmark
Populated places established in 2007